Kathwana is a growing town which is the official headquarters for Tharaka Nithi County government.

References

County capitals in Kenya
Populated places in Eastern Province (Kenya)